Tignes – Val d'Isère is the combined ski resort area of Val d'Isère and Tignes in the Tarentaise Valley, Savoie in the French Alps. Formerly known as Espace Killy, in honour of the spectacularly successful skier Jean-Claude Killy who was raised here.There are claimed to be 300 km of pistes:

 22 green runs, 61 blues, 46 reds and 25 blacks, plus 44 km of cross country skiing
 2 terrain parks
 2 glaciers 	
 90 ski lifts

References 

Ski areas in France
Geography of Savoie
Tourist attractions in Savoie
Sports venues in Savoie